Freddye Scarborough Henderson (February 18, 1917– January 19, 2007) was an American business woman and travel agent known for pioneering travel agencies geared towards African-Americans. Henderson was born in Franklinton, Louisiana, on February 18, 1917  She earned a B.S. in home economics from Southern University in 1937 and was the first African American to earn a degree in fashion merchandising from New York University in 1950 and went on to teach fashion and textiles at Spelman College. She married Jacob R. Henderson in Georgia in 1941. From 1944 to 1950 Henderson owned a dress shop in Atlanta. In 1950, Henderson became a fashion editor for the Associated Negro Press and had a fashion column which was syndicated in many black newspapers in America. From 1957 to 193, Henderson wrote a syndicated weekly column, “Travel by Freddye,” which ran in the Pittsburgh Courier.

In 1955, Henderson and her husband created the Henderson Travel Service located in Atlanta. It was the first African American travel agency in the Southeast and the first fully accredited black travel agency in America. She planned Martin Luther King Jr.’s trip to Oslo to accept his Nobel Peace Prize and accompanied him on the trip.

She died on January 19, 2007, after a lengthy illness and was buried at Atlanta's South-View Cemetery.

References

External links 

 Stuart A. Rose Manuscript, Archives, and Rare Book Library, Emory University: Freddye Scarborough Henderson papers, circa 1940-1992

1917 births
2007 deaths
People from Louisiana
Travel agents (people)
African-American businesspeople
American women in business
People from Georgia (U.S. state)
Burials at South-View Cemetery
20th-century African-American women
20th-century African-American people
20th-century American people
Southern University alumni
New York University alumni
21st-century American women